The Rohtas gecko (Cyrtopodion rohtasfortai) is a species of gecko, a lizard in the family Gekkonidae. The species is endemic to Pakistan.

Geographic range
Within Pakistan, C. rohtasfortai occurs in southwestern Azad Kashmir and northeastern Punjab Province.

Reproduction
C. rohtasfortai is an oviparous species.

References

Further reading
Bauer, Aaron M.; Masroor, Rafaqat; Titus-McQuillan, James; Heinicke, Matthew P.; Daza, Juan D.; Jackman, Todd R. (2013). "A preliminary phylogeny of the Palearctic naked-toed geckos (Reptilia: Squamata: Gekkonidae) with taxonomic implications". Zootaxa 3599 (4): 301-324.
Khan, M.S.; Tasnim, Rashida (1990). "A New Gecko of the Genus Tenuidactylus from Northeastern Punjab, Pakistan, and Southwestern Azad Kashmir ". Herpetologica 46 (2): 142-148. (Tenuidactylus rohtasforti, new species).

Cyrtopodion
Reptiles described in 1990
Reptiles of Pakistan